Mieczysław Kazimierz Baszko (born 26 June 1961 in Boratyńszczyźna) – is a Polish politician, from 2014 to 2015 marshal of the Podlaskie Voivodeship, member of the VIII and IX Sejm. Member of The Republicans since 2021. Agreement member in 2018-2021, until 2018 member of PSL.

References 

1961 births
Living people
Polish People's Party politicians
Voivodeship marshals of Poland
Podlaskie Voivodeship
Members of the Polish Sejm 2015–2019
Members of the Polish Sejm 2019–2023